The National Code ( is a single comprehensive code that includes criminal and civil code along with the code of procedures of  Nepal. The National Code has been replaced by the Muluki Criminal Code and its Code of Procedures and the Muluki Civil Code and its Code of Procedures on August 17, 2018.

History

The Manav Nyaya Shastra (Newari: Nyayavikasini; literally: Human Justice Code) is the first codified law of Nepal. It was written during the Malla Dynasty in the 14th century. This is believed to be the root of structured law system in Nepal.

The Mulukī Ain of 1854 is the foundational legal text for modern Nepal. The laws remained largely unchanged until 1963. In 2018, the Mulukī Ain was replaced by the new criminal and civil codes, and their respective codes of procedure.

Outline
It was enacted by king Mahendra.
The General Code is divided into the following parts and chapters:

 Preamble
 Part 1
 On Preliminary Matters

 Part 2
 Chapter 1:	On Court Proceedings
 Chapter 2:	On Punishment

 Part 3
 Chapter 1:	On Document Scrutiny
 Chapter 2:	On Guarantee
 Chapter 3:	On Bona Vacantia
 Chapter 4:	On Wages
 Chapter 5:	On Pauper
 Chapter 6:	On Lost and Found Quadruped
 Chapter 7:	On Trusts
 Chapter 8:	On Cultivation of Land
 Chapter 9:	On Land Evictions
 Chapter 10:	On Encroachment of Land
 Chapter 11:	On Construction of Buildings
 Chapter 12:	On Husband and Wife
 Chapter 13:	On Partition
 Chapter 14:	On Women's Share and Property
 Chapter 15:	On Adoption
 Chapter 16:	On Inheritance
 Chapter 17:	On General Transactions
 Chapter 18:	On Bailment
 Chapter 19:	On Donation and Gift
 Chapter 20:	On Insolvency/Bankruptcy
 Chapter 21:	On Registration of Deeds
 Chapter 22:	On Default of Payment

 Part 4
 Chapter 1:	On Forged Document (Forgery)
 Chapter 2:	On Looting
 Chapter 3:	On Cheating
 Chapter 4:	On Theft/Stealing
 Chapter 5:	On Arson
 Chapter 6:	On Counterfeiting
 Chapter 7:	On Quadruped
 Chapter 8:	On Illegal Detention
 Chapter 8A:	On Kidnapping/Abduction and Hostage Taking
 Chapter 9:	On Hurt/Battery
 Chapter 10:	On Homicide
 Chapter 11:	On Human Trafficking
 Chapter 12:	On Medical Treatment
 Chapter 13:	On Intention of Sex
 Chapter 14:	On Rape
 Chapter 15:	On Incest
 Chapter 16:	On Bestiality
 Chapter 17:	On Marriage
 Chapter 18:	On Adultery
 Chapter 19:	On Decency/Etiquette

 Part 5
 Repeal

References

Nepal
Law of Nepal
1963 establishments in Nepal